Michael Cameron Catt (born December 25) is a producer, author and former Senior Pastor of Sherwood Baptist Church since 1989 until his retirement in 2021. He was an executive producer for the 2008 film, Fireproof. He is an author and has written several books and booklets. He married Terri Catt in 1974, and they have two daughters; Hayley Catt and Erin Bethea, who was in said film.

Catt received an undergraduate degree from Mississippi College, a master of divinity degree from Luther Rice Bible Seminary and doctor of ministry degree from Trinity Theological Seminary of South Florida.

Publications 
Left My Mind in Mississippi...But I Still Have My Ministry, Brentwood Christian Prress (January 1, 1994)
May Be Wrong...But I Doubt It!
Reflections On The Gospels
Prepare for Rain: The Story of a Church That Believed God for the Impossible, CLC Ministries (July 2007)
Fireproof Your Life: Building a Faith that Survives the Flames CLC Publications (2008)The Power of Desperation: Breakthroughs in Our Brokenness, B & H Publishing Group (2009)The Power of Persistence:Breakthroughs in Your Prayer Life, B & H Publishing Group (2009)The Power of Surrender: Breaking Through to Revival, B & H Publishing Group (2010)

 References 

 External links 
 Michael Catt at Sherwood Baptist Church
 
 Fireproof Your Life
 Pastors' Conf. nominee announced at the Baptist Press
 God is source of marriage, Fireproof producer says at the Florida Baptist Witness Fireproof producer & pastor, Michael Catt, shares parenting advice at the Florida Baptist Witness''

People from Albany, Georgia
Living people
Mississippi College alumni
Year of birth missing (living people)